Ronnie Brooks may refer to:

 Ronnie Brooks (Law & Order: UK), a character on the TV series Law & Order: UK
 Ronnie Baker Brooks (born 1967), American Chicago blues and soul musician